Philip Michael Podsakoff (born 1948) is an American management professor, researcher, author, and consultant who held the John F. Mee Chair of Management at Indiana University. Currently, he is the Hyatt and Cici Brown Chair in Business at the University of Florida.

Biography 
Podsakoff was born in Fresno, California, earned a BA and MBA from California State University Fresno, and a DBA from Indiana University in 1980. His dissertation thesis was titled "Performance models, microeconomics and schedule responding in humans." Upon graduation from the doctoral program, he joined the management faculty of the Ohio State University for two years (1980-1982), and then returned to Indiana University as an assistant professor in the Management department, where he spent most of his career (1982-2013). He became an Emeritus professor at Indiana University in 2013, and joined the faculty of the Warrington College of Business at the University of Florida in Gainesville, FL. Podsakoff has also consulted with several domestic and international companies, including Ashland Chemical Co., Dow Chemical, Duke Realty, Eli Lilly and Company, General Electric, Kimball International, Harrah's Entertainment, Price Waterhouse Coopers, Prudential Insurance Company of America, State Farm Insurance Company, and Texas Gas Company. Philip is married to Vernie (Vera, nee Kochergin) Podsakoff; they have one child, Nathan Podsakoff, who is a professor in the Eller College of Management at the University of Arizona.

Selected publications

Books  
Simpson, Douglas B, & Philip M. Podsakoff. Workshop Management: A Behavioral and Systems Approach. Springfield, Ill: Thomas, 1975. 
Scott, W E, and Philip M. Podsakoff. Behavioral Principles in the Practice of Management. New York: Wiley, 1985. 
Organ, Dennis W, Philip M. Podsakoff, & Scott B. MacKenzie. Organizational Citizenship Behavior: Its Nature, Antecedents, and Consequences. Thousand Oaks: SAGE Publications, 2006. . According to WorldCat, this book is held in 408 libraries around the world.
Podsakoff, P.M., MacKenzie, S.B., & Podsakoff, N.P. (Eds.). (2018). The Oxford Handbook of Organizational Citizenship Behavior. Oxford, UK: Oxford University Press.

Selected articles
Podsakoff, P.M., & Organ, D.W. (1986). Self-reports in organizational research: Problems and prospects. Journal of Management, 12, 531–544.
Podsakoff, P.M., & Todor, W.D. (1985). Relationships between leader reward and punishment behavior and group processes and productivity. Journal of Management, 11, 55–73.
Jarvis, C.B., MacKenzie, S.B., & Podsakoff, P.M. (2003). A critical review of construct indicators and measurement model misspecification in marketing and consumer research. Journal of Consumer Research, 30, 199–218.
Podsakoff, P.M., MacKenzie, S.B., Lee, J.Y., & Podsakoff, N.P. (2003). Common method biases in behavioral research: A critical review of the literature and recommended remedies. Journal of Applied Psychology, 88, 879–903.
MacKenzie, S.B., Podsakoff, P.M., & Jarvis, C.B. (2005). The problem of measurement model misspecification in behavioral and organizational research and some recommended solutions. Journal of Applied Psychology, 90, 710–730.
MacKenzie, S.B., Podsakoff, P.M., & Podsakoff, N.P. (2011). Construct measurement and validation procedures in MIS and behavioral research: Integrating new and existing techniques. MIS Quarterly, 35, 293–334. 
Podsakoff, P.M., MacKenzie, S.B., & Podsakoff, N.P. (2012). Sources of method bias in social science research and recommendations on how to control it. Annual Review of Psychology, 63, 539–569.
Podsakoff, P.M., MacKenzie, S.B., Moorman, R., & Fetter, R. (1990).The impact of transformational leader behaviors on employee trust, satisfaction, and organizational citizenship behaviors. The Leadership Quarterly, 1, 107–142.
Podsakoff, P.M., MacKenzie, S.B., & Bommer, W. (1996). A Meta-analysis of the relationships between Kerr and Jermier's substitutes for leadership and employee job attitudes, role perceptions, and performance. Journal of Applied Psychology, 81, 380–399.
Podsakoff, P.M., MacKenzie, S.B., & Bommer, W. (1996). Transformational leader behaviors and substitutes for leadership as determinants of employee satisfaction, commitment, trust, and organizational citizenship behaviors. Journal of Management, 22, 259–298.
Podsakoff, P.M., Bommer, W.H., Podsakoff, N.P., & MacKenzie, S.B. (2006). Relationships between leader reward and punishment behavior and subordinate attitudes, perceptions, and behaviors: A meta-analytic review of existing and new research. Organizational Behavior and Human Decision Processes, 99, 113–142.
Podsakoff, P.M., Ahearne, M., & MacKenzie, S.B. (1997). Organizational citizenship behavior and the quantity and quality of work group performance. Journal of Applied Psychology, 82, 262–270.
Podsakoff, P.M., & MacKenzie, S.B. (1997). The Impact of organizational citizenship behavior on organizational performance: A review and suggestions for future research. Human Performance, 10, 133–151.
Podsakoff, P.M., MacKenzie, S.B., Paine, J. & Bachrach, D.G. (2000). Organizational citizenship behaviors: A critical review of the theoretical and empirical literature and suggestions for future research. Journal of Management, 26, 513–563.
Podsakoff, N.P., Whiting, S.W., Podsakoff, P.M., & Blume, B.D. (2009). Individual- and organizational-level consequences of organizational citizenship behaviors: A meta-analysis. Journal of Applied Psychology, 94, 122–141.
Podsakoff, P.M., MacKenzie, S.B., Bachrach, D.G., & Podsakoff, N.P. (2005). The influence of management journals in the 1980s and 1990s. Strategic Management Journal, 26, 473–488.
Podsakoff, P.M., MacKenzie, S.B., Podsakoff, N.P., & Bachrach, D.G. (2008). Scholarly influence in the field of management: A bibliometric analysis of the determinants of university and author impact in the management literature in the past quarter century. Journal of Management, 34, 641–720.

Awards and honors 
In 2000, he was awarded The Leadership Quarterly's Decennial Influential Article Award (for Podsakoff, MacKenzie, Moorman, & Fetter, 1990), given by the editors a decade after an article is published “as a celebration of the article’s impact on the field.” 
In 2005, he was awarded the William A. Owens Scholarly Achievement Award (for Podsakoff, MacKenzie, Lee, & Podsakoff, 2003). This award recognizes the best publication (in a refereed journal) in the field of industrial and organizational psychology.
In 2013, he was awarded the Academy of Management's (AOM) Research Methods Division's Lifetime Achievement Award, for his significant contributions to the advancement of research methodology.
In 2018, he was awarded the Society for Industrial and Organizational Psychology's (SIOP) Distinguished Scientific Contributions Award in recognition of a lifetime of outstanding contributions to the science of industrial and organizational psychology. 
In 2019, he received the Academy of Management's Distinguished Scholarly Contributions of Management Award in recognition of "long-term, significant contributions in one or more of the following areas: conceptual, empirical or theoretical developments; creating and disseminating new knowledge; and advancing management knowledge and practice."
In 2021, he received the Samuel J. Messick Distinguished Scientific Contributions Award, given by Division 5 (Quantitative and Qualitative Methods) of the American Psychological Association (APA). This award is presented annually to honor an individual who has a long and distinguished history of scientific contributions within the field of quantitative research methods.
He is a Fellow of both the Academy of Management (elected 2009) and Society of Industrial and Organizational Psychology (elected 2007).

According to the Web of Science, Podsakoff's research has been cited over 65,500 (h index = 50); and according to Google Scholar, his work has received over 171,000 citations (h index = 78).

References

External links 
Faculty page at Florida
Faculty page at  Indiana

1948 births
Living people
California State University, Fresno alumni
Indiana University alumni
Indiana University faculty
Ohio State University faculty
University of Florida faculty